In category theory, a branch of mathematics, a symmetric monoidal category is a monoidal category (i.e. a category in which a "tensor product"  is defined) such that the tensor product is symmetric (i.e.  is, in a certain strict sense, naturally isomorphic to  for all objects  and  of the category). One of the prototypical examples of a symmetric monoidal category is the category of vector spaces over some fixed field k, using the ordinary tensor product of vector spaces.

Definition
A symmetric monoidal category is a monoidal category (C, ⊗, I) such that, for every pair A, B of objects in C, there is an isomorphism  called the swap map that is natural in both A and B and such that the following diagrams commute:
The unit coherence:

The associativity coherence:

The inverse law:

In the diagrams above, a, l, and r are the associativity isomorphism, the left unit isomorphism, and the right unit isomorphism respectively.

Examples
Some examples and non-examples of symmetric monoidal categories:
 The category of sets. The tensor product is the set theoretic cartesian product, and any singleton can be fixed as the unit object.
 The category of groups. Like before, the tensor product is just the cartesian product of groups, and the trivial group is the unit object.
  More generally, any category with finite products, that is, a cartesian monoidal category, is symmetric monoidal. The tensor product is the direct product of objects, and any terminal object (empty product) is the unit object.
 The category of bimodules over a ring R is monoidal (using the ordinary tensor product of modules), but not necessarily symmetric. If R is commutative, the category of left R-modules is symmetric monoidal. The latter example class includes the category of all vector spaces over a given field.
  Given a field k and a group (or a Lie algebra over k), the category of all k-linear representations of the group (or of the Lie algebra) is a symmetric monoidal category. Here the standard tensor product of representations is used.

Properties 
The classifying space (geometric realization of the nerve) of a symmetric monoidal category is an  space, so its group completion is an infinite loop space.

Specializations 
A dagger symmetric monoidal category is a symmetric monoidal category with a compatible dagger structure.

A cosmos is a complete cocomplete closed symmetric monoidal category.

Generalizations 
In a symmetric monoidal category, the natural isomorphisms  are their own inverses in the sense that . If we abandon this requirement (but still require that  be naturally isomorphic to ), we obtain the more general notion of a braided monoidal category.

References 

 
 

Monoidal categories